Arundel railway station serves the market town of Arundel in West Sussex. It is  down the line from  via .

The station is situated on the A27 and is the transport hub for many settlements in the Arun District area, including Angmering and Wick, for passengers joining London-bound services to the capital and Gatwick Airport.
The station is served by the No. 9 Stagecoach bus service that operates between Arundel, Littlehampton, Rustington, and Shoreham; bus stops are outside the station on the A27.

The station can accommodate 12 coach trains and is one of the few stations along the Arun Valley route that does not have coach restriction announcements.

History

Opened by the London, Brighton and South Coast Railway as part of the Mid-Sussex railways, it became part of the Southern Railway during the Grouping of 1923. The station then passed on to the
Southern Region of British Railways on nationalisation in 1948.

When Sectorisation was introduced in the 1980s, the station was served by Network SouthEast until the Privatisation of British Railways.

Until 1978, most trains from Arundel to London were routed via Dorking and Sutton, which was slightly quicker than today's workings. However, since 1978, services now serve Gatwick Airport and Croydon, and passengers for Dorking and Sutton now take a connecting train at Horsham.

The current use of the station is for predominantly London or Gatwick Airport bound passenger traffic. On Mondays to Saturdays, southbound trains currently only serve Ford, Barnham, and Bognor Regis. Passengers for Chichester, Portsmouth Harbour and Southampton have a change of train at Barnham.   
Currently, there are no regular direct trains to Littlehampton.

Services
All services at Arundel are operated by Southern using  EMUs.

The typical off-peak service in trains per hour is:
 2 tph to  via 
 2 tph to 

Gallery

References 

 
 
 Station on navigable O.S. map

External links 

 

Arun District
Railway stations in West Sussex
DfT Category E stations
Former London, Brighton and South Coast Railway stations
Railway stations in Great Britain opened in 1863
Railway stations served by Govia Thameslink Railway
Railway station